Veluša (Cyrillic: Велуша) is a village in the municipality of Konjic, Bosnia and Herzegovina.

Demographics 
According to the 2013 census, its population was 6, all Bosniaks.

References

Populated places in Konjic